National Union was a Spanish far right electoral coalition which contested the 1979 Spanish general election. It linked Blas Piñar's Fuerza Nueva francoist party with the Carlists.

The coalition gathered 378,964 votes (2.11%), which earned it one seat in Madrid, held by Piñar.

Elections results

Congress of Deputies / Senate

See also
 National Alliance July 18

References

Defunct political party alliances in Spain
Far-right political party alliances in Spain
20th century in Spain
1979 establishments in Spain
Political parties established in 1979
1982 disestablishments in Spain
Political parties disestablished in 1982
Defunct nationalist parties in Spain
Falangist parties